was a Japanese politician. He graduated from Waseda University in 1943 and became general secretary of the Central Executive Committee of the Japan Socialist Party in December 1977.

References

Japanese politicians
1920 births
1995 deaths